Love and a Bullet is a 2002 action film starring American rapper Treach of Naughty by Nature. It was released to theaters on August 30, 2002 and was directed by Ben Ramsey and Kantz.

Plot
While staking out his next assignment, the innocent girlfriend of his notorious boss, contract killer Malik (Treach) reflects on the dark path he's chosen but cannot escape. Torn between his sense of duty and his newfound sense of humanity, he finds that the only way out is a perilous showdown with men who are every bit as cold-blooded as he is.

Cast
Treach as Malik Bishop
Kent Masters King as Cynda Griffie 
Charles Guardino as Damien Wiles
Shireen Crutchfield as Hylene
Sam Scarber as Buddy
Walter Jones as Cisco
James Black as Vaughn
Derek Mears as The Milkman
Freez Luv as Frenchy

Box office
Love and a Bullet was only released in 14 theaters and was only shown for three weeks. In its limited release, Love and a Bullet grossed $18,926.

Soundtrack
 

Love and a Bullet is the soundtrack to the 2002 action film, Love and a Bullet. It was released on June 11, 2002 through TVT Records and consisted entirely of hip hop music. The soundtrack did not make it to any Billboard charts, but one single did, Jim Crow's "Holla at a Playa" went to 97 on the Hot R&B/Hip-Hop Singles & Tracks.

Track listing
"Rah Rah"- 3:59 (Rottin Razkals & Naughty by Nature) 
"Sound Off"- 4:26 (Ying Yang Twins)  
"Payback"- 3:29 (Techniec) 
"The Unexxpected"- 3:52 (Sixx John) 
"Let's Go"- 3:50 (Mr. Cheeks) 
"Give It to Her"- 3:32 (Tanto Metro & Devonte) 
"Holla at a Playa"- 3:31 (Jim Crow) 
"Bia' Bia'"- 3:52 (Chyna Whyte, Too Short & The East Side Boyz) 
"We Can't Lose"- 4:57 (Rottin Razkals) 
"Pimpin' Hoes"- 3:51 (Kokane & Pimpin' Young)
"Platinum in da Ghetto"- 4:21 (Lil' Keke)  
"Nice Ta Meet Ya"- 3:38 (Baby Beesh)  
"Thug fa Life"- 3:59 (Chyna Whyte) 
"Knuckle Up" (Tre+6)

External links

2002 films
American action films
Films about snipers
TriStar Pictures films
2002 action films
Films scored by Tyler Bates
2000s English-language films
2000s American films